The brown-capped vireo (Vireo leucophrys) is a small passerine bird.  It breeds in highlands from southern Mexico south to northwestern Bolivia. It is sometimes considered to be conspecific with the similar warbling vireo.

The adult brown-capped vireo is 12–12.7 cm in length and weighs 12 g. It has olive-green upperparts and a brown crown. There is a brown line from the bill through the eyes, and a white supercilium. The face and throat are off-white, and the underparts are otherwise yellow with some olive on the flanks. Young birds are buff-brown above with a weaker supercilium.

The brown-capped vireo has a sharp  call and the song is a rich warbled here you see me hear me sing so sweet, reminiscent of that of the warbling vireo.

This vireo occurs in the canopy and middle levels of light woodland, the edges of forest, and other semi-open habitats at altitudes from 500 to 2500 m. Brown-capped vireos feed on caterpillars and other insects gleaned from tree foliage. They also eat small fruits. They will join mixed-species feeding flocks.

The nest is undescribed.

Footnotes

References
 Hilty, Steven L. (2003): Birds of Venezuela. Christopher Helm, London. 
 Stiles, F. Gary & Skutch, Alexander Frank (1989): A guide to the birds of Costa Rica. Comistock, Ithaca. 
 Strewe, Ralf & Navarro, Cristobal (2004): New and noteworthy records of birds from the Sierra Nevada de Santa Marta region, north-eastern Colombia. Bull. B.O.C. 124(1): 38–51. PDF fulltext

brown-capped vireo
Birds of Central America
Birds of the Northern Andes
brown-capped vireo
Taxa named by Frédéric de Lafresnaye